Lilburn Henderson Snodgrass (May 18, 1859 – March 9, 1930) was an American politician who served in the Virginia House of Delegates.

References

External links 

Democratic Party members of the Virginia House of Delegates
19th-century American politicians
1859 births
1930 deaths